Bob Christie (April 4, 1924 – June 1, 2009) was an American racecar driver. Christie raced in the USAC Championship Car series in the 1956-1963 seasons, with 15 career starts, including every Indianapolis 500 race in that span.  He finished in the top ten 5 times, with his best finish in 3rd position in 1959 at Daytona. He died in Grants Pass, Oregon.

Indianapolis 500 results

Complete Formula One World Championship results
(key)

1924 births
2009 deaths
Indianapolis 500 drivers
American racing drivers
Racing drivers from Oregon
Sportspeople from Grants Pass, Oregon
World Sportscar Championship drivers
Carrera Panamericana drivers